The Prairie Wife is a 1925 American silent Western film directed by Hugo Ballin and featuring Boris Karloff, and based on a story by Arthur Stringer. The film is considered to be lost.

Plot
As described in a film magazine review, a telegram informs Chaddie Green that her father has committed suicide, leaving her penniless. She has been reared in luxury, but, during her passage to the United States, she is so lonely that she makes an acquaintance with Duncan MacKail, a rugged appearing man from the American plains. He loves her and they decide to get married. At his ranch, she is extremely out of place, not knowing the method of ranch life or work and untrained for hard farm work. She is frightened by the presence of Ollie, the caretaker for Duncan. Nearby is Percy Woodhouse, an Englishman seeking health on the prairies. Chaddie is obliged to stay at his ranch over night when her horse bolts from her and she is unable to get a mount from Percy. Duncan is angered when she does not return and accuses Percy. Later, Ollie is found dangling from a rope in the barn. Chaddie's picture of her father is found in the room of Ollie, which is explained by a note saying he had killed the man. A son is later born to Chaddie, who has grown content to live and work on the prairie with Duncan.

Cast

Reception
It received a lukewarm review in Film Daily, as having some "humorous touches scattered through" but overlong. Variety wrote that "for a cheap picture, it should more than get the production cost back and show a corking profit."

See also
 Boris Karloff filmography

References

External links
 
 

1925 films
1925 Western (genre) films
1925 lost films
American black-and-white films
Films directed by Hugo Ballin
Lost American films
Lost Western (genre) films
Metro-Goldwyn-Mayer films
Silent American Western (genre) films
1920s American films